Dino Risi (23 December 1916 – 7 June 2008) was an Italian film director. With Mario Monicelli, Luigi Comencini, Nanni Loy and Ettore Scola, he was one of the masters of commedia all'italiana.

Biography
Risi was born in Milan. He had an older brother, Fernando, a cinematographer, and a younger brother, Nelo (1920–2015), a director and writer. At the age of twelve, Risi became an orphan and was looked after by relatives and friends of his family. He studied medicine but refused to become a psychiatrist, as his parents wished 

Risi started his career in cinema as an assistant director to cinema figures such as Mario Soldati and Alberto Lattuada. Later he began directing his own films and was credited with giving early opportunities to future acting stars such as Sophia Loren and Vittorio Gassman. His 1966 film Treasure of San Gennaro was entered into the 5th Moscow International Film Festival where it won a Silver Prize.

His biggest hits were Poor, But Handsome (Poveri ma belli), followed by two sequels, which he also directed; A Difficult Life (Una vita difficile); The Easy Life (Il sorpasso); Opiate '67 or, in a cut version, 15 From Rome (I Mostri); and Scent of a Woman (Profumo di Donna), which was remade by Martin Brest starring Al Pacino in 1992.

In 2002, he was awarded the Golden Lion – Honorary Award (Leone d'oro alla carriera) at the Venice Film Festival for his life-time work. Two of his films, Il giovedì and Il commissario Lo Gatto, were shown in a retrospective section on Italian comedy at the 67th Venice International Film Festival.

He died on 7 June 2008 at his residence in Rome. He was 91 and was survived by two children, Claudio (1948–2020) and Marco Risi (1951), both film directors.

Filmography

Verso la vita (1946)
Tigullio minore (1947)
1848 (1948)
 Songs in the Streets (1950)
 Vacation with a Gangster (1952)
Il viale della speranza (1953)
L'amore in città (episode "Paradiso per 4 ore", 1953)
Il segno di Venere (1955)
Pane, amore e... (1955)
Poveri ma belli (1956)
La nonna Sabella (1957)
Belle ma povere (1957)
Venezia, la luna e tu (1959)
Il vedovo (1959)
Poveri milionari (1959)
Il mattatore (1959)
Un amore a Roma (1960)
A porte chiuse (1961)
A Difficult Life (Una vita difficile, 1961)
The Easy Life (Il sorpasso, 1962)
March on Rome (La marcia su Roma, 1962)
Il giovedì (1963)
I mostri (1963)
Le bambole (episode "La telefonata", 1965)
Il Gaucho (1965)
I complessi (episode "Una giornata decisiva", 1965)
L'ombrellone (1966)
I nostri mariti (episode "Il marito di Attilia", 1966)
Operazione San Gennaro (1966)
Il Tigre (1967)
Straziami, ma di baci saziami (1968)
Il profeta (1968)
Vedo nudo (1969)
Il giovane normale (1969)
In nome del popolo italiano (1971)
La moglie del prete (1971)
Noi donne siamo fatte così (1971)
Mordi e fuggi (1973)
Sessomatto (1973)
Profumo di donna (1974)
The Career of a Chambermaid (1976)
Anima persa (1977)
La stanza del vescovo (1977)
I nuovi mostri (episodes "Con i saluti degli amici", "Tantum ergo", "Pornodiva", "Mammina mammona" and "Senza parole", 1978)
Primo amore  (1978)
Caro papà (1979)
Sono fotogenico (1980)
Sunday Lovers/I seduttori della domenica (episode "Roma", 1980)
Fantasma d'amore (1981)
Sesso e volentieri (1982)
...e la vita continua (TV, 1984)
Dagobert (1984)
Scemo di guerra (1985)
Teresa (1987)
Il commissario Lo Gatto (1987)
Il vizio di vivere (TV, 1989)
Tolgo il disturbo (1990)
Vita coi figli (TV, 1990)
Giovani e belli (1996)
Esercizi di stile (episode "Myriam", 1996)

References

External links

BBC obituary

1916 births
2008 deaths
César Award winners
Italian film directors
Film people from Milan
David di Donatello winners
Nastro d'Argento winners
David di Donatello Career Award winners